The California City Whiptails were a professional baseball team based in California City, California that began play in 2017. They were a member of the Pecos League, an independent baseball league which is not affiliated with MLB or Minor League Baseball.

The Whiptails played in the Pecos League from 2017 to 2019, and folded following the 2019 season. The team was originally planned to return in 2021, however, due to the Pecos League revising the divisions, the team will not return.

References

External links

 Pecos League website

Pecos League teams
Professional baseball teams in California
Baseball teams established in 2016
2016 establishments in California
Defunct independent baseball league teams
Sports in Kern County, California
California City, California
Baseball teams disestablished in 2019
2019 disestablishments in California
Defunct baseball teams in California